Maurice Lampre (29 June 1930 – 21 May 2001) was a French professional racing cyclist. He rode in three editions of the Tour de France, and once in each of the Giro d'Italia and the Vuelta a España, from 1955 to 1959.

References

External links
 

1930 births
2001 deaths
French male cyclists
Place of birth missing